"The Good Life" is a song and the second single from Three Days Grace's 2009 album Life Starts Now. It was released for radio airplay on February 9, 2010. It charted at number 85 on the Canadian Hot 100 before becoming a single. The song hit number one on the Mainstream Rock Tracks and Rock Songs chart and number four on the Alternative Songs chart matching "Break". It was the second most played song on the Active Rock format in 2010.

Background
The song was featured on ESPN's Winter X Games XIV, and was also used during the Professional Motocross Freestyle show Nuclear Cowboyz. "The Good Life" was the featured song for the 2010 ACC men's basketball tournament, and also during the 2010 NFL Draft. The song was also performed during a concert of Three Days Grace along series of concerts during the 2010 Winter Olympics in Vancouver on February 15, 2010. The song was also featured in the movie Blue Crush 2.

Critical reception
AXS.com listed "The Good Life" as one of the "top 10 best Three Days Grace songs." Patricia Jones of AXS praised the song for its "incredibly bouncy" and "infectious" sound. She stated, "The springy chords and compelling drums make it an easy choice for listening, jamming, and dancing."

Track listing
Promotional single
"The Good Life" – 2:52

Music video
The band shot the video with director Michael Maxxis on March 23, 2010. The video was released on April 27, 2010. The video consists of the band performing in a garage, with Adam Gontier wearing a Citizen Cope outfit, with clips of people performing activities, both recreational and with violent overtones. The video ends with a man kissing his wife and leaving for work. In contrast to the clean and professionally shot look of previous music video for "Break", this video is filmed with a handheld camera in a messy, real world environment and makes heavy use of video editing effects and colour grading to look rough and visually vibrant.

Personnel
Adam Gontier – lead vocals
Barry Stock – lead guitar
Brad Walst – bass guitar, backing vocals 
Neil Sanderson – drums, backing vocals

Accolades

Charts

Weekly charts

Year-end charts

Certifications

See also
List of Billboard Mainstream Rock number-one songs of the 2010s
List of number-one Billboard Rock Songs

References

External links

2009 songs
2010 singles
Three Days Grace songs
Songs written by Adam Gontier
Jive Records singles
Song recordings produced by Howard Benson